The following towns, neighborhoods, and developments are examples of New Urbanism.

Australia

New South Wales
 Cape Cabarita, Cabarita
 Tullimbar Village, Shellharbour (proposal)

South Australia
 Mawson Lakes, North Adelaide

Tasmania
 Skylands, Tranmere (proposal)

Victoria
 Beacon Cove, Port Melbourne
 Kensington Banks/Lynch's Bridge, Kensington
 Rippleside, North Geelong
 Waterford Green, Footscray

Western Australia
 Ascot Waters, Belmont
 Claisebrook Village, East Perth
 Cockburn Central, Perth
 Ellenbrook, Perth
 Marlston Hill, Bunbury
 Subi Centro, Subiaco
 The Village at Wellard, Wellard

Bhutan
 Thimphu

Canada

Alberta
 Garrison Woods, Calgary
 Alpine Park, Calgary
 McKenzie Towne, Calgary

British Columbia
 South East False Creek (Olympic Village), Vancouver

Ontario
 Cornell Village, Markham

Costa Rica
 Las Catalinas

Europe

Finland
 Kartanonkoski, Vantaa

France
 Val d'Europe

Georgia
 Green Lisi Town

Italy
 Fonti di Matile, Reggio Emilia

Germany
 Anklam market square and riverfront 
 Gladbeck, Michael Stojan projects
 Kirchsteigfeld (Drewitz), Potsdam
 Rieselfeld, Freiburg
 Vauban, Freiburg

Netherlands
 Brandevoort, Helmond

Poland
 Elbląg, town center masterplan
 Szczecin, town center masterplan

Portugal
 Alta de Lisboa, Lisbon

Sweden

 Jakriborg, Hjärup
 Sankt Eriksområdet, Stockholm

United Kingdom
 Chapelton, Aberdeenshire
 Coed Darcy, Wales
 Knockroon, East Ayrshire
 Poundbury, Dorset
 Tornagrain, Inverness-shire

India
 Lavasa

Mexico
 La Primavera, Leon

United States

Alabama
 Blount Springs, Blount Springs
 Hampstead, Montgomery
 Mt. Laurel, Shelby County
 Providence, Huntsville
 The Village Tannin, Orange Beach
 The Ledges, Huntsville
 The Preserve, Hoover
 Trussville Springs, Trussville

Arizona
 Civano, Tucson
 Verrado, Buckeye
 Agritopia, Gilbert

Arkansas
 The Village at Hendrix, Conway

California
 Chico - Barber Yard, Doe Mill, Meriam Park, Westside Place
 City of Villages, San Diego
 Civita, San Diego
 Laguna West, Elk Grove
 Playa Vista, Los Angeles
 Aggie Village, Davis
 Bay Meadows, San Mateo, California

Colorado

 Bradburn Village, Westminster
 Highlands' Garden Village, Denver
 Prospect New Town, Longmont
 South Main in Buena Vista
 Stapleton in Denver
 Three Springs in Durango

Florida

 Abacoa, Jupiter
 Alys Beach
 Amelia Park on Amelia Island, Fernandina Beach
 Aragon, Pensacola
 Avalon Park, near Orlando
 Baldwin Park, Orlando
 Brytan, Gainesville
 Disney's Celebration
 Golden Oak at Walt Disney World Resort
 Haile Plantation, Gainesville
 Harmony, near St. Cloud
 Independence, near Winter Garden
 Laureate Park, Lake Nona
 Miami Lakes
 Mizner Park, Boca Raton
 Oakland Park, Winter Garden
 Owl's Head, Freeport
 ParkSquare, Aventura
 Reunion, near Celebration
 Rosemary Beach
 Rosemary Square, West Palm Beach
 Salamanca, Miami
 Seaside
 Sky, Calhoun County
 SouthWood, Tallahassee
 Town of Tioga, Florida, Tioga, Florida
 Tradition, near Port St. Lucie
 WaterColor, near Destin
 Winthrop, Brandon
 The Villages, a retirement community in central Florida

Georgia
 Glenwood Park, Atlanta
 Inman Park Village, Atlanta
 Serenbe, Chattachoochee Hills
 Tributary at New Manchester, Atlanta
 Vickery, Cumming

Hawaii
 Olawalu Town, Olowalu, Maui

Illinois
 Prairie Crossing, Grayslake
 The Glen, Glenview

Indiana
 Anson, Anson
 Saxony, Saxony
 West Clay, Carmel

Iowa
 The Peninsula Neighborhood, Iowa City
 Village of Ponderosa, West Des Moines
 West Glen Town Center, West Des Moines
 Prairie Trail, Ankeny

Kansas
 Greensburg
 City Center, Lenexa
 New Market, Kansas City
 Park Place, Leawood

Kentucky

Louisville
 Liberty Green, Phoenix Hill
 Norton Commons, Worthington 
 Park DuValle, Park DuValle
 RiverPark Place, Butchertown

Louisiana
 Acadia Plantation, Thibodaux
 Perkins Rowe, Baton Rouge
 Provenance, Shreveport
 River Garden, New Orleans
 River Ranch, Lafayette
 Riverview, West Baton Rouge Parish
 Settlement at Willow Grove, Baton Rouge
 Sugar Mill Pond, Youngsville
 TerraBella, Covington
 Village at Magnolia Square, Central

Maryland
 Kentlands , Gaithersburg
 King Farm, Rockville
 Lakelands, Gaithersburg
 Miles Point, St. Michaels
 Sandy Spring, Sandy Spring
 Stage Coach Crossing, La Plata
 Summerfield, Snow Hill
 Sunset Island, Ocean City

Massachusetts
 Mashpee Commons, Mashpee

Michigan
 Cherry Hill Village, Cherry Hill

Minnesota
 Clover Ridge, Chaska
 Excelsior and Grand, St. Louis Park
 Heart of the City, Burnsville
 Penn and American, Bloomington
 Lino Lakes Town Center , Lino Lakes
 The Shoppes at Arbor Lakes, Maple Grove

Mississippi

 Bellegrass, Hattiesburg
 The Cotton District, Starkville
 Florence Gardens, Gulfport
 The Town of Lost Rabbit, Madison County
 Plein Air, Taylor
 Tradition, Harrison County

Missouri
Kansas City Area
 Crescent Creek Homes, Raytown
 New Longview Lake, Lee's Summit
 Northgate Village, North Kansas City
 River Market, Kansas City
 The New Town at Liberty, Liberty
 The Village at Chapman Lake, Blue Springs
 The Village at Shoal Creek Valley, Kansas City
 Zona Rosa, Kansas City

St. Louis Area
 Station Plaza, Kirkwood
 The New Town at St. Charles, St. Charles
 The Wildwood Town Center, Wildwood

Elsewhere in Missouri
 Village of Cherry Hill, Columbia
 Chesterfield Village, Springfield

New Mexico
 Aldea de Santa Fe, Santa Fe
 Mesa del Sol, Albuquerque

New Jersey
 Bayfront, Jersey City
 Old York Village, Chesterfield Township
 Canal Crossing, Jersey City
 University Heights, Newark

New York
 Ewen Point, Esopus Lake
 Warwick Grove, Warwick

North Carolina
 Ayrsley, Charlotte
 Afton Village, Concord
 Biltmore Park, Asheville
 Birkdale Village, Huntersville
 Cheshire, Black Mountain
 Harrisburg Town Center, Harrisburg
 Lake Park, Union County
 Mayfaire Town Center, Wilmington
 Southern Village and Meadowmont, Chapel Hill
 Trillium, Jackson County
 Vermillion, Huntersville

Oklahoma
 Wheeler District, Oklahoma City
 Carlton Landing, Eufaula
 Harlow, Tulsa

Ohio
 Arena District, Columbus
 Creekside Gahanna, Gahanna
 Easton Town Center, Columbus
 Jeffrey Place, Columbus
 Jerome Village, Dublin
 New Haven, Barberton
 South Campus Gateway, Columbus
 The Greene, Beavercreek

Oregon
 Fairview Village, Fairview
 Hoyt Street Yards, Pearl District, Portland
 New Columbia, Portland
 Northwest Crossing, Bend
 Orenco Station, Hillsboro
 Pringle Creek Community, Salem
 South Waterfront, Portland
 South Hillsboro, Hillsboro
 Villebois, Wilsonville

Pennsylvania
 Black Horse, Gettysburg
 Crawford Square, Pittsburgh
 SouthSide Works, Pittsburgh
 Summerset at Frick Park, Pittsburgh
 Walden Crossroads, Mechanicsburg

South Carolina
 Baxter Village outside Fort Mill
 Celadon on Lady's Island, Beaufort
 Griffin Park, Greenville
 Habersham, Beaufort
 I'On Village, Mt. Pleasant
 Lake Carolina, Columbia
 Morris Square, Charleston
 The Market Common, Myrtle Beach

Tennessee

 Cordova the Town, Shelby County
 Harbor Town, Memphis
 Lakeland Green, Lakeland, a northeastern suburb of Memphis
 Northshore Town Center, the western area of Knoxville
 South Bluffs, Memphis
 Westhaven, Franklin, a southern suburb of Nashville

Texas
 Addison Circle, Addison
 Beachtown, Galveston
 Austin Ranch, The Colony
 BLVD Place, Houston
 Cinnamon Shore, Port Aransas
 Craig Ranch, McKinney
 Firewheel Town Center, Garland
 La Centerra, Katy
 Legacy Town Center, Plano
 Plum Creek, Kyle
 Lexington Park, the Downtown Plano Transit Village, Plano
 Mueller, Austin
 Palmilla Beach, Port Aransas
 Parker Square, Flower Mound
 Regent Square, Houston
 River Oaks District, Houston
 Southlake Town Square, Southlake
 Sugar Land Town Square, Sugar Land
 Sunflower Beach, Port Aransas
 The Woodlands Market Center, The Woodlands
 West Village and Uptown, Dallas

Utah
 Daybreak, South Jordan
Elim Valley, Hurricane

Virginia
 Belmont Forest, Loudoun County
 Haymount, Caroline County
 Ladysmith Village
 Leeland Station, Fredericksburg
 The Mosaic District, Fairfax County
 New Post, Spotsylvania County
 Rockets Landing, Richmond, Virginia
 West Broad Village, Henrico County
 One Loudoun, Loudoun County
 East Beach, Norfolk, Virginia

Washington
 Cascadia, Bonney Lake
 High Point, Seattle
 Issaquah Highlands, Issaquah
 NewHolly/Othello Station, Seattle
 Northwest Landing, DuPont
 The Lookout, Chelan

Wisconsin
 Bayshore Town Square, Milwaukee
 Beerline B, Milwaukee
 Grandview Commons, Madison
 Liberty Square, Sun Prairie
 Middleton Hills, Middleton
 Providence, Sun Prairie
 Smiths Crossing, Sun Prairie
 The Uplands, Sun Prairie
 The Village at Autumn Lake, Madison

West Virginia
 Barboursville

References

External links
 Links to Traditional Neighborhood Developments (TNDs) and New Urban Neighborhoods

New Urbanism

fr:Exemples d'urbanisme néo-traditionnel